Francesco Andrés Akermann Silva (born 7 March 1995) is a Venezuelan-born Chilean professional footballer who last played for Provincial Ovalle as a forward.

Career
As a child, he was with club Danger from Cerro Barón and Santiago Wanderers. Next he played for Unión La Calera, making 5 appearances, and was loaned to Brujas de Salamanca in the Tercera B in 2015. After he played for Provincial Ovalle and Casey Comets FC in Australia.

Personal life
He prefers to be named Akermann Francesco Silva.

He came to Valparaíso, Chile, at the age of 7 and naturalized Chilean by residence.

References

External links
 
 
 Akermann Silva at As.com 

1995 births
Living people
Venezuelan footballers
Venezuelan emigrants to Chile
Naturalized citizens of Chile
Chilean footballers
Association football forwards
Chilean Primera División players
Unión La Calera footballers
Venezuelan expatriate footballers
Expatriate footballers in Chile
Venezuelan expatriate sportspeople in Chile
Expatriate soccer players in Australia
Venezuelan expatriate sportspeople in Australia
Chilean expatriate sportspeople in Australia